Simon Hickey (born 12 January 1994) is a New Zealand rugby union player who plays for Crusaders (rugby union) in the Super Rugby.

He has represented Auckland in the National Provincial Championship, playing as a first five-eighth. He is a former New Zealand Schools representative and was captain of both the King's College 1st XV and its 1st XI cricket team. He made his Auckland debut after coming off the bench in a 59–16 win over Manawatu at Eden Park, contributing two conversions.

Simon Hickey had signed for the Hurricanes (rugby union) for the 2021 season, however ruptured his ACL during pre season ending his season prematurely. This led to him being signed by the Crusaders (rugby union) for 2022.

References

External links
 http://www.aucklandrugby.co.nz/players/0-Simon-Hickey.aspx

1994 births
New Zealand rugby union players
Auckland rugby union players
Rugby union fly-halves
Blues (Super Rugby) players
People educated at King's College, Auckland
Rugby union players from Auckland
Living people
Union Bordeaux Bègles players
New Zealand expatriate rugby union players
New Zealand expatriate sportspeople in France
Expatriate rugby union players in France
Edinburgh Rugby players
Hurricanes (rugby union) players
Crusaders (rugby union) players
Expatriate rugby union players in Scotland
New Zealand expatriate sportspeople in Scotland
Hino Red Dolphins players